Bertold Löffler (28 September 1874, Liberec — 23 March 1960, Vienna) was an Austrian painter, printmaker, and designer. His work was part of the painting event in the art competition at the 1936 Summer Olympics.

Further reading 
 Kehl-Baierle, Sabine. "Löffler, Bertold." In Grove Art Online. Oxford Art Online, (accessed February 4, 2012; subscription required).
 E. Patka (Ed.): Bertold Löffler. Exhibit catalog, Universität für angewandte Kunst, Vienna, 2000.

References

External links 
 Entry for Bertold Löffler on the Union List of Artist Names
 About Löfflers life and work from the Albertina
 Gallery of lithographs and print work attributed to Loffler

19th-century Austrian painters
19th-century Austrian male artists
Austrian male painters
20th-century Austrian painters
1874 births
1960 deaths
Artists from Liberec
Austrian printmakers
Austrian designers
Wiener Werkstätte
20th-century printmakers
Olympic competitors in art competitions
Austrian people of German Bohemian descent
20th-century Austrian male artists